Hemiloapis is a genus of longhorn beetles of the subfamily Lamiinae, containing the following species:

 Hemiloapis endyba Galileo & Martins, 2004
 Hemiloapis mena Martins & Galileo, 2006
 Hemiloapis yandaira Galileo & Martins, 2004
 Hemiloapis ybyra Galileo & Martins, 2004

References

Hemilophini